Amazonis Planitia (Latin Amāzŏnis) is one of the smoothest plains on Mars. The plain's topography exhibits extremely smooth features at several different lengths of scale. A large part of the Medusae Fossae Formation lies in Amazonis Planitia.

Its name derives from one of the classical albedo features observed by early astronomers, which was in turn named after the Amazons, a mythical race of warrior women.

Age and composition
Only approximately 100 million years old, these plains provide some of the fewest sedimentary layers impeding viewing of the Martian terrain, and closely resemble the composition of Earth's Iceland. Formed by free-flowing lava across great plains, Amazonis has been described by William Hartmann as a "bright dusty volcanic desert crossed by many fresh-looking lava flows."

Amazonis has become the primary focus of modern research efforts both because of its geological composition and because of its relative youth compared to other Martian regions, which are often hundreds of millions of years older. Hartman writes that the plain closely resembles Iceland's surface, with its "strange cobweb-like networks of ridges and crags [on both planets, divide] smoother areas into a pattern something like fragments of a broken plate." Both land masses' shapes have been formed by lava flows from volcanic eruptions, causing both surfaces to be covered by a thick layer of hardened lava. Findings from aerial footage of both Amazonis and Iceland have shown nearly identical terrain patterns, signifying the comparative ages of the two regions.

The entire contemporary era on Mars has been named the Amazonian Epoch because researchers originally (and incorrectly) thought Amazonis Planitia to be representative of all Martian plains. Instead, over the past two decades, researchers have realized that the area's youth and extremely smooth surface actually distinguish the area from its neighbors. It is even possible that the area possessed distinctive characteristics when all of Mars was under water.

Although the full implications of Amazonis's youth have not yet been determined, the nature of the area (i.e. lack of sedimentary rock) has at least provided researchers evidence that the areas are the most likely to provide future discoveries, and as such, has been proposed as a future site for most NASA landings.

Medusae Fossae Formation
The Medusae Fossae Formation is a soft, easily eroded deposit that extends for nearly 1,000 km along the equator of Mars. The surface of the formation has been eroded by the wind into a series of linear ridges called yardangs. These ridges generally point in direction of the prevailing winds that carved them and demonstrate the erosive power of Martian winds. The easily eroded nature of the Medusae Fossae Formation suggests that it is composed of weakly cemented particles,

Linear ridge networks
Linear ridge networks are found in various places on Mars in and around craters.   Ridges often appear as mostly straight segments that intersect in a lattice-like manner.  They are hundreds of meters long, tens of meters high, and several meters wide.  It is thought that impacts created fractures in the surface, these fractures later acted as channels for fluids.  Fluids cemented the structures.  With the passage of time, surrounding material was eroded away, thereby leaving hard ridges behind.   
Since the ridges occur in locations with clay, these formations could serve as a marker for clay which requires water for its formation.  Water here could have supported past life in these locations.  Clay may also preserve fossils or other traces of past life.

Streamlined shapes
When a fluid moves by a feature like a mound, it will become streamlined.  Often flowing water makes the shape and later lava flows spread over the region.  In the pictures below this has occurred.

Lava flows

Dark slope streaks
Many places on Mars show dark streaks on steep slopes, such as crater walls.  It seems that the youngest streaks are dark and they become lighter with age.  Often they begin as a small narrow spot then widen and extend downhill for hundreds of meters.  Several ideas have been advanced to explain the streaks. Some involve water, or even the growth of organisms.  The streaks appear in areas covered with dust.  Much of the Martian surface is covered with dust because at more or less regular intervals dust settles out of the atmosphere covering everything.  We know a lot about this dust because the solar panels of Mars rovers get covered with dust.  The power of the Rovers has been saved many times by the wind, in the form of dust devils that have cleared the panels and boosted the power.  So we know that dust falls from the atmosphere frequently.

It is most generally accepted that the streaks represent avalanches of dust.  Streaks appear in areas covered with dust.  When a thin layer of dust is removed, the underlying surface appears dark.  Much of the Martian surface is covered with dust.  Dust storms are frequent, especially when the spring season begins in the southern hemisphere.  At that time, Mars is 40% closer to the sun.  The orbit of Mars is much more elliptical than the Earth's.  That is, the difference between the farthest point from the sun and the closest point to the sun is very great for Mars, but only slight for the Earth.  Also, every few years, the entire planet is engulfed in a global dust storm.  When NASA's Mariner 9 craft arrived there, nothing could be seen through the dust storm. Other global dust storms have also been observed, since that time.

Brain terrain
Brain terrain is common in many places on Mars.  It is formed when ice sublimates along cracks.  The ridges of brain terrain may contain a core of ice.  Shadow measurements from HiRISE indicate the ridges are 4–5 meters high.

More Images from Amazonis Planitia

Interactive Mars map

See also
Amazonian (Mars)
Dark slope streaks
Geography of Mars 
List of plains on Mars
Medusae Fossae Formation

References

External links

Google Mars zoomable map centered on Amazonis Planitia
HiRISE image of faulting in Amazonis Planitia

Plains on Mars
Amazonis quadrangle
Memnonia quadrangle